Czerwenka is a surname, a Germanized version of the Czech surname Červenka. Notable people with the surname include:

Isabel Czerwenka-Wenkstetten (born 1969), Austrian visual artist
Joseph Czerwenka (1759–1835), Austrian oboist
Oskar Czerwenka (1924–2000), Austrian operatic bass and academic teacher

See also
Červenka (disambiguation)

Surnames of Czech origin
German-language surnames